Aïn Cheikh is a village in the commune of Sidi Khellil, in El M'Ghair District, El Oued Province, Algeria.

References

Neighbouring towns and cities

Populated places in El Oued Province